Elias Conwell House is a historic home located at Napoleon, Ripley County, Indiana.  It was built about 1822, and is a two-story, "L"-shaped, Federal style brick dwelling. The main block has a hipped roof and rear ell a gable roof. It sits on a full stone basement. The main entrance is flanked by sidelights and fluted pilasters and is topped by a fanlight.  It was built for Elias Conwell, who operated a popular store at Napoleon.

It was added to the National Register of Historic Places in 1979.

References

Houses on the National Register of Historic Places in Indiana
Federal architecture in Indiana
Houses completed in 1822
Buildings and structures in Ripley County, Indiana
National Register of Historic Places in Ripley County, Indiana
1822 establishments in Indiana